USS Grand Rapids may refer to:

, was commissioned 10 October 1944 and sold 14 April 1947 for scrapping
, was commissioned 5 September 1970

United States Navy ship names